Stezzano is a comune (municipality) in the Province of Bergamo in the Italian region of Lombardy, located about  northeast of Milan and about  south of Bergamo.

Main sights
Villa Moroni (17th century)
Villa Caroli-Zanchi
Villa Moroni
Villa Maffeis
Sanctuary of Madonna dei Campi
Parish church of St. John the Baptist and St. Peter (17th-19th centuries)
Via Roma  12

People 

 Tavo Burat, (1932-2009), journalist

References